The Torture Papers is the debut album by underground hip hop collective Army of the Pharaohs, released March 21, 2006 on Babygrande Records. The crew was established in 1998 by Jedi Mind Tricks frontman Vinnie Paz, and originally featured Jedi Mind Tricks, Chief Kamachi, 7L & Esoteric, Virtuoso and Bahamadia. Virtuoso and Bahamadia later split from the group, which now consists of Paz, Kamachi, 7L & Esoteric, Apathy, OuterSpace, King Syze, Reef the Lost Cauze, Des Devious, Celph Titled and Faez One. An Army of the Pharaohs collaboration album was rumored to be in the works for years, but was often delayed due to separate projects and internal problems, however a mixtape titled After Torture There's Pain was released in 2007.

The album debuted in the Top 50 on Billboard's Top Independent Albums and Top Heatseekers charts, going on to sell over 20,000 copies.

Track listing

Album singles

Chart positions

References 

2006 debut albums
Army of the Pharaohs albums
Jedi Mind Tricks albums
Babygrande Records albums
Horrorcore albums